These are the official results of the Women's 5000 metres event at the 1998 European Championships in Budapest, Hungary. The final was held on 23 August 1998. The event replaced the 3,000 metres, which was contested for the last time at the European Championships four years ago in Helsinki, Finland.

Medalists

Results

Final

References

Results
Results
Results

5000
5000 metres at the European Athletics Championships
1998 in women's athletics